Puhuangyu Station is an interchange subway station between Line 5 and Line 14 of the Beijing Subway. Line 14 station was opened on December 26, 2015. The name Puhuangyu combines the first character from the names of three constituent villages: Puzhuang, Huangtukeng, Yushucun.

Station layout
Both the line 5 and 14 stations have underground island platforms.

Exits 
There are 7 exits, lettered A, B, C, D, E, F, and G. Exits B and F are accessible.

References

External links
 

Beijing Subway stations in Fengtai District
Railway stations in China opened in 2007